The Main Seattle Post Office has a significant history.

1903 building
The former post office on Third Avenue and Union Street was a "grand Beaux Arts" building with Neoclassical features built from 1903 - 1908 and housed federal offices in addition to the post office. The sandstone used for its construction was porous and over several decades pollutants caused it to deteriorate. James Knox Taylor was the building's supervising architect. The building was replaced by a modern structure in 1959.

1959 building

The current Midtown Post Office is located on the east side of 3rd Avenue between University and Union streets. It is a three-story building which measures approximately 96’ x 211’ and includes underground/basement level parking.  It is constructed in the Modernist International style and is considered a heritage building by the City of Seattle. It was designed by Naramore, Bain, Brady, and Johanson.

1880 predecessor
The first Seattle post office was built on what is now Post Avenue or Post Alley in 1880.

References

Post office buildings in Washington (state)